The Saint in Palm Springs is a crime melodrama released by RKO Pictures in early 1941. The film continued the screen adventures of the Robin Hood-inspired anti-hero, Simon Templar, alias "The Saint", created by Leslie Charteris.

This sequel was based upon a story by Charteris; however, many changes to his concept were made. Charteris later novelised his version of the film story as the novella "Palm Springs", contained within the 1942 collection The Saint Goes West. This was the sixth of eight in RKO's film series about The Saint.

The central cast was identical to the previous entry, The Saint Takes Over. George Sanders returned  as Templar (his final performance in the role), with Jonathan Hale making his own final appearance as Inspector Farnack (the character would next be seen in The Saint in Manhattan, a 1980s television pilot). Wendy Barrie makes her third and final appearance, once again playing a different character, as does Paul Guilfoyle, reprising the role of Clarence "Pearly" Gates from the previous film. The director, Jack Hively, was the son of the film's editor, George Hively.

The storyline involves The Saint pursuing rare stamps at a Palm Springs, California hotel.

Plot
Simon Templar is asked by his friend, Inspector Farnack, to protect Peter Johnson, a man trying to transport three stamps, valued at $200,000, from New York City to his niece Elna, a tennis pro for a hotel in Palm Springs, California. Templar interrupts an attempted robbery, but is too late to save Johnson's life. He does strike the unseen assailant in the face with his ring, which bears his distinctive Saint sign.

On the train west, Templar introduces himself to the attractive Margaret Forbes, who will be staying at the same Palm Springs hotel. There the stamps are stolen from Templar, which does not endear him to Elna Johnson. Templar's friend, reformed pickpocket Clarence "Pearly" Gates, is employed by the hotel to provide security, so Templar persuades him to steal the belongings from every other hotel guest in an effort to identify the thief. The stamps are found in a pillbox, but Gates cannot remember who it belongs to. An attempt to trap the thief by allowing the guests robbed to reclaim their property fails and ends in the murder of a policeman, but Templar avoids losing the stamps again and returns them to Elna.

Templar sets a trap for the thief. Johnson is held up at gunpoint by Forbes, who turns out to be an agent for the country from which the stamps were smuggled. Forbes is killed by a rival thief while making her getaway, but the stamps are safe. Simon sets another trap at Joshua Tree National Park, where another hotel guest is revealed to be the mastermind of the other crooks. Templar tricks him into confessing to the murders of Peter Johnson, the policeman and Margaret Forbes in the presence of the Police Commissioner and his men, and the whole gang is arrested. The mark from Templar's ring on his face is additional proof of the murderers guilt.

Elna Johnson shows her romantic interest in Templar, but he tells her that, while he is tempted, he prefers to play singles, rather than doubles.

Cast
 George Sanders as Simon Templar
 Wendy Barrie as Elna Johnson
 Jonathan Hale as Inspector Farnack
 Paul Guilfoyle as "Pearly" Gates
 Linda Hayes as Margaret Forbes
 Harry Shannon as Chief Graves
 Ferris Taylor as Evans

Reception
The film made a profit of $90,000.

References

External links
 
 
 
 

1941 films
1941 crime drama films
American black-and-white films
Films scored by Roy Webb
Films set in Palm Springs, California
The Saint (Simon Templar)
American crime drama films
RKO Pictures films
Films directed by Jack Hively
Melodrama films
1940s American films
1940s English-language films